Georgios Tsirogiannis  (born 2 June 1983) is a Greek football player who plays as a midfielder for Egaleo F.C. in the Greek Beta Ethniki.

Career
Tsirogiannis previously played for Paniliakos F.C., Panachaiki 2005 F.C., Ilisiakos F.C. and Chaidari F.C.

References

External links
 
Myplayer Profile

1983 births
Living people
Greek footballers
Chaidari F.C. players
Egaleo F.C. players
Panachaiki F.C. players
Paniliakos F.C. players
Ilisiakos F.C. players
Association football midfielders